Al-Wahda Sports Club is a Syrian multi-sports club based in Damascus. It is mostly known for its football and basketball teams. The football team plays in Syria's top competition, the Syrian Premier League. Al-Wahda SC was founded in 1928 and its colours are orange and white. They play their home games at the Al-Jalaa Stadium. The club is nicknamed The Damascene orange.

The club has one of Syria's most prominent football charts, as it won the Syrian Premier League 2 times, the Syrian Cup 8 times and the Syrian Super Cup 3 times. Internationally, Al-Wahda biggest achievement is participation in the final of the 2004 AFC Cup.

Al-Wahda SC have competed in the AFC Champions League group stage as first Syrian club in history and have reached the knockout rounds of the AFC Cup four times, as well as reaching the round of 32 at the Arab Club Champions Cup twice.

History
Founded in 1928, Al Wahda is one of the oldest clubs in the Arab world. Previous names for the club include Al Ghouta, and Qasioun (named after Mount Qasioun which overlooks the city of Damascus).

Ahmed Ezzat Rifai is the original founder of this club. He met with a group of friends in Souq Saruja, Damascus to discuss setting up a new sports club, and they agreed to found the club and named it Qasioun. The club was officially opened in 1928 and hosted a series of sports, including football and weightlifting.

The "Golden Era"
Nenad Stavrić is a Serbian coach who joined Al-Wahda club in 2001. He started with two losses against Al-Horriya and Al-Karamah followed with draw with Al-Jaish, the team had to wait until the fifth week of the season to achieve their first win with the new coach. The team finished the league in the third place. In his second year the team had a big improvement In the level of performance especially with the new formation 4–4–2 which was the first time ever a Syrian team to use it, in the beginning the results was awful with the new formation especially the big defeat against the Saudi Arabia champion Al-Ittihad Jeddah seven to nothing in the Arabian club tournament, but after that the team keep improving to win the Syrian Cup in 2003 against Al-Ittihad Aleppo after a dramatic match 5–3. In the next season he made the dream true and Al-Wahda is the 2003–04 Syrian League champion for the first time in the club history, also the team reached the final of AFC Cup and lost against the other Syrian side Al-Jaish after losing the first game 2–3 and winning the second game 1–0. In 2004–05 the team was too close to win the title again but it lost it in the last few weeks with missing a key players along the season with major injury. The curse of injuries continued in the following season but even though the team was closer than the year before to clinch the title. The chairman of the club Khaled Hbobaty decided to replace him with Mansoor Haj Saied and the club entered the black tunnel for several years and remains so to this day.

Stadiums

Al-Jalaa Stadium

Al-Jalaa Stadium is located in Mazzeh municipality of Damascus, Syria. The stadium consists of a football field, and spaces that accommodate around 10,000 spectators, together with a VIP seats area that accommodates around 100 guests.

Abbasiyyin Stadium

Al-Wahda formerly played their home games at their own ground, Abbasiyyin Stadium, but maintenance deficiencies prevented the club from using the stadium. As a consequence, Al-Jalaa Stadium replaced it as the official home ground.

Supporters and rivalries
Since the beginning of the 21st century, Al-Wahda has established itself as adored by the masses of the capital and all of Syria, reaching the third place among the clubs in the Arab world. Al-Wahda's supporters are called the "Crazy Orange" Ultras, and they emerged as an organized group around 2017.

The biggest rival of the club is Al-Jaish SC, with whom they play the Damascus city derby. Other big rivalries are with Al-Ittihad SC Aleppo, Al-Karamah SC or Tishreen SC.

Colours and kits
The club's home jersey is based on the orange color that, in addition to the Damascus sword monument located on Umayyad Square and Damascene Jasmine, the club has had in its emblem since its foundation. Away jerseys are white with orange edges.

Shirt sponsor & kit manufacturer

Honours

Domestic
Syrian Premier League:  2
Winners: 2003–04, 2013–2014

Syrian Cup: 8
Winners: 1993, 2003, 2012, 2013, 2015, 2016, 2017, 2020

Syrian Super Cup: 3
Winners: 1993, 2016, 2020

Continental
AFC Cup:
Runners-up: 2004

Regional
Arab Club Champions Cup:
Round of 32: 2006, 2007

Notes:
In 2016, Al-Wahda received an extraordinary Nine Values Cup, an award of the international children's social programme Football for Friendship.

Performance in AFC competitions

AFC Champions League: 1 appearance
2005: Group Stage
AFC Cup: 8 appearances
2004: Finalists
2013: Qualifying Round
2014: Group Stage
2015: Round of 16
2016: Round of 16
2017: Zonal finals
2018: Group Stage
2021: Group Stage

Records
Accurate as of 28 September 2022

Performance in UAFA competitions
Arab Club Champions Cup: 3 appearances
2002–03: Group Stage 
2005–06: Round of 32
2006–07: Round of 32

Records
Accurate as of 28 September 2022

Players

First-team squad

Personnel

Current technical staff
{| class="wikitable"
|-
! style="color:white; background: #FF5F00; |Position
! style="color:white; background: #FF5F00; |Name
|-
|Head coach
| Ammar Shamali
|-
|Assistant coach
| Ismail Fatout Majed al-Haj
|-
|Assistant coach and analyst
| Mohamed Al-Masry
|-
|Fitness coach
| Farouk Al Khan Khaled Zaza
|-
|Goalkeeping coach	
| 	Safwan Al Hussein
|-
|Team administrator 
| Samir Daoud
|-
|Technical director
|  Walid Al Sharif

Administration

Club presidents
 List of Al Wahda presidents since 1974:

Former managers

 Ayman Hakeem (1993–1995)
 Sameer Soukieh (1995–2001)
 Nenad Stavrić (2001–06)
 Mansour Al Haj Saied (2006)
 Ayman Hakeem (2006–07)
 Costică Ştefănescu (2007)
 Muhammad Jomma (2007–08)
 Nizar Mahrous (2008)
 Assaf Khalifa (2009)
 Faruk Kolović (2009)
 Nizar Mahrous (2009–11)
 Ayman Hakeem (2012)
 Hussam Al Sayed (2012)
 Mohannad Al Fakir (2013)
 Rafat Muhammad (2013–2017, 2018, 2019)
 Eyad Abdulkareem (2019–2020)
 Ghassan Maatouk (2020–2021)
 Ayman Hakeem (2021)
 Maher Bahri (2021–2022)
 Siniša Dobrašinović (2022)
 Ammar Shamali (2022–present)

Notable former players

Player records

League top scorer 

 Al Wahda club players won the title of top scorer in the Syrian Premier League 7 times:

Top scorers
List of top scorers for Al Wahda club in the league and cup historically:

Notes

References

External links
 Official website 

1928 establishments in Mandatory Syria
Association football clubs established in 1928
Football clubs in Syria
Sport in Damascus